Tone Tantrum is an album by American jazz pianist Gene Harris recorded in 1977 and released on the Blue Note label.

Reception
The Allmusic review by Jason Ankeny awarded the album 3½ stars stating "Gene Harris never veered closer to mainstream jazz-funk than Tone Tantrum -- a slick, propulsive record... Still, while the sound is radio-friendly, the quality and complexity of the performances serve as a potent reminder that Tone Tantrum is first and foremost a jazz record, and a solid (if unconventional) one at that, purists be damned.

Track listing
 "As" (Stevie Wonder) - 7:38
 "If You Can't Find Love Let Love Find You" (Jerry Peters) - 6:14
 "A Minor" (Peters) - 7:23
 "Stranger in Paradise" (Alexander Borodin, Robert Wright, George Forrest) - 5:15
 "Peace of Mind" (Al McKay) - 4:33
 "Cristo Redentor Part 1" (Duke Pearson) - 4:55
 "Cristo Redentor Part 2" (Pearson) - 4:52
Recorded at Total Experience Studios in Los Angeles, California in March–May, 1977.

Personnel
Gene Harris - piano, electric piano, synthesizer
Jerry Peters - electric piano, synthesizer, vocals, arranger
Al McKay, John Rowin - electric guitar
Anthony Jackson, Robert Popwell, Chuck Rainey, Verdine White - electric bass
Leon "Ndugu" Chancler, Harvey Mason, Alvin Taylor - drums
Jerry Steinholz - percussion
Ralph Beecham - vocals
Kenneth Yerke, Blanche Belnick, Harry Bluestone, Bonnie Douglas, Assa Drori, Ron Folsom, Winterton Garvey, William Henderson, Janice Gower, Mary Ann Kinggold, Rollice Dale, Denyse Buffum, Paul Pavlonick, Dennis Karmazyn, Selene Hurford, Richard Feves - strings
Dorothy Ashby - harp
Donald Byrd, Ray Jackson, George Thatcher, Maurice Spears, Donald Cook, Earl Dumler, David Crawford - horns
Venetta Fields, D.J. Rogers, Maxine Waters, Julia Waters, Oren Waters, Deneice Williams, AnnEsther Davis, Gary Gairet - backing vocals

References

Blue Note Records albums
Gene Harris albums
1977 albums
Albums produced by Jerry Peters
Albums recorded at Total Experience Recording Studios